The 2014–15 Russian Handball Super League is the 23rd season of the Super League, Russian premier Handball league.

Team information 

The following 12 clubs compete in the Super League during the 2014–15 season:

Personnel and kits
Following is the list of clubs competing in 2014–15 Russian Handball Super League, with their president, head coach, kit manufacturer and shirt sponsor.

Regular season

Standings

Pld - Played; W - Won; L - Lost; GF - Goals for; GA - Goals against; Diff - Difference; Pts - Points.

References

External links
 Russian Handball Federaration 

2014–15 domestic handball leagues
Super League
Super League